Peronedon is an extinct genus of lepospondyl amphibian in the family Diplocaulidae. It is distinguished from other diplocaulids by the absence of a postorbital.

Phylogeny
Below is a cladogram modified from Germain (2010):

References

Cisuralian amphibians of North America
Diplocaulids
Taxa named by Everett C. Olson
Fossil taxa described in 1970